Gents Without Cents is a 1944 short subject directed by Jules White starring American slapstick comedy team The Three Stooges (Moe Howard, Larry Fine and Curly Howard). It is the 81st entry in the series released by Columbia Pictures starring the comedians, who released 190 shorts for the studio between 1934 and 1959.

Plot
The Stooges are small-time song-and-dance performers who are having trouble rehearsing due to loud tapping that is going on one story above them. When they go to give the rowdies a piece of their mind, three lovely ladies named Flo (Lindsay Bourquin), Mary (Laverne Thompson) and Shirley (Betty Phares) come to the door. It turns out the girls are performing their tap dance routine. The six become friends and go to a talent agent, Manny Weeks (John Tyrrell), to show off their stuff. However, he is at first unimpressed with the Stooges' act, but hires them anyway to perform at the Noazark Shipbuilding Company to entertain defense workers.

The Stooges, as "Two Souls and a Heel", slay the audience with their hilarious "Niagara Falls" routine ("slowly I turned, step by step, inch by inch..."). When the boys receive word that the headliners (The Castor and Earl Review) have to bail, they and the girls offer to take their place. Weeks is so enthralled with the boys' performance that he offers to send the trio to Broadway.

The Stooges nearly leave their ladies, but end up getting married first with a honeymoon planned for — where else? — Niagara Falls. Curly ends up running for his life from a carload of fellow Stooges Moe; Larry and their brides.

Production notes
The Stooges filmed the "Niagara Falls" routine in 1943 for the feature film Good Luck, Mr. Yates, but the scene was cut at the last minute. Instead of wasting the footage, Columbia built Gents Without Cents around it. Filming commenced on June 14–16, 1944.

Gents Without Cents is the first Stooge film to employ a syncopated, jazzy version of "Three Blind Mice" as the Stooges' theme song. The new version is in the key of F, while the key of G was previously utilized. This syncopated version would be used briefly after the next film, No Dough Boys. This version was revamped during the Shemp Howard and Joe Besser era. The title is a play on "without sense." Other parodies include The Noazark (Noah's Ark) Shipbuilding Company and show headliners, the Castor and Earl (castor oil) Revue.

Weeks is unimpressed at first because the trio sing a peppy/sappy song in the passé style of about 1910 called "We Just Dropped In To Say Hello". He brightens up when they start a more up-to-date, jazzy nonsense scat singing number called "Rat-tat-toodle-oodle-day-ay".

The theatrical agent's sign lists business locations as "New York, Chicago, London ... Berlin soon". This film was released just a few months after D-Day, at a time when Allied forces were making steady advances. The scat singing part of the Stooges' audition for the agent includes parodies of Hideki Tōjō (Larry), Benito Mussolini (Curly), and Adolf Hitler (Moe).

An obvious flub was left in the short at approximately 12:27 (the end of the "Niagara Falls" routine) as Larry misses the line "... step-by-step" going directly to "...inch by inch," while Moe says the line correctly. It is unclear why director Jules White left the mistake in, when using an alternate, correct, take would have taken only a few minutes, unless he felt that such a mistake would be consistent with the amateur entertainment that Howard, Fine, and Howard were supposed to be in the short.

See also
List of American films of 1944

References

External links
 "Slowly I Turned": A Piece of America's Pop Culture - credits Joey Faye (1909-1997) as originator
 
 

1944 films
1944 comedy films
American black-and-white films
Columbia Pictures short films
Films directed by Jules White
The Three Stooges films
Niagara Falls in fiction
American comedy short films
1940s English-language films
1940s American films